Gerald "Spike" Schultz is a Canadian retired ice hockey goaltender who set the NCAA record for consecutive shutouts during his first season as the starter for North Dakota.

Career
Schultz was the Fighting Sioux's main goaltender for the 1953–54 season. While the team finished with a middling record (14–12–1) the highlight of the season was a 4-game stretch in January where Spike Schultz could not be beaten. A scheduling quirk had North Dakota play Michigan Tech in four consecutive games over a three-week period. Because Tech was the worst team in the WIHL that season the Sioux had a good chance to climb in the standings, but no one could have predicted that the Huskies wouldn't be able to score a single goal. Spike Schultz turned aside every puck that came his way for four games, setting a new NCAA record for consecutive shutouts (4). His shutout streak wasn't much longer than those four contests and ended at 249:41. While the NCAA had only officially recognized ice hockey as a sport for seven seasons at that point, Schultz' record stood for over 50 years until Blaine Lacher strung 5 straight goose-eggs together and shattered the shutout streak by over 125 minutes.

Schultz' astounding performance earned him a spot on the AHCA First Team All-American. Outside that remarkable performance, however, Schultz had a rather pedestrian career in net for North Dakota; he allowed over 4 goals per game and had only one other shutout in two seasons.

Statistics

Regular season and playoffs

Awards and honors

References

External links

Year of birth unknown
Canadian ice hockey goaltenders
North Dakota Fighting Hawks men's ice hockey players
Ice hockey people from Edmonton
AHCA Division I men's ice hockey All-Americans